Jonas Ferdinand Gabriel Lippmann (16 August 1845 – 13 July 1921) was a Franco-Luxembourgish physicist and inventor, and Nobel laureate in physics for his method of reproducing colours photographically based on the phenomenon of interference. His parents were French Jews.

Early life and education
Gabriel Lippmann was born in Bonnevoie, Luxembourg (Luxembourgish: Bouneweg), on 16 August 1845. At the time, Bonnevoie was part of the commune of Hollerich (Luxembourgish: Hollerech) which is often given as his place of birth. (Both places, Bonnevoie and Hollerich, are now districts of Luxembourg City.) His father, Isaïe, a French Jew born in Ennery near Metz, managed the family glove-making business at the former convent in Bonnevoie. In 1848, the family moved to Paris where Lippmann was initially tutored by his mother, Miriam Rose (Lévy), before attending the Lycée Napoléon (now Lycée Henri-IV). He was said to have been a rather inattentive but thoughtful pupil with a special interest in mathematics. In 1868, he was admitted to the École normale supérieure in Paris where he failed the agrégation examination which would have enabled him to enter the teaching profession, preferring instead to study physics. In 1872, the French government sent him on a mission to Heidelberg University where he was able to specialize in electricity with the encouragement of Gustav Kirchhoff, receiving a doctorate with "summa cum laude" distinction in 1874. Lippmann then returned to Paris in 1875, where he continued to study until 1878, when he became professor of physics at the Sorbonne.

Career
Lippmann made several important contributions to various branches of physics over the years.

The capillary electrometer
One of Lippmann's early discoveries was the relationship between electrical and capillary phenomena which allowed him to develop a sensitive capillary electrometer, subsequently known as the Lippmann electrometer which was used in the first ECG machine. In a paper delivered to the Philosophical Society of Glasgow on 17 January 1883, John G. M'Kendrick described the apparatus as follows:

Lippmann's electrometer consists of a tube of ordinary glass, 1 metre long and 7 millimetres in diameter, open at both ends, and kept in the vertical position by a stout support. The lower end is drawn into a capillary point, until the diameter of the capillary is .005 of a millimetre. The tube is filled with mercury, and the capillary point is immersed in dilute sulphuric acid (1 to 6 of water in volume), and in the bottom of the vessel containing the acid there is a little more mercury. A platinum wire is put into connection with the mercury in each tube, and, finally, arrangements are made by which the capillary point can be seen with a microscope magnifying 250 diameters. Such an instrument is very sensitive; and Lippmann states that it is possible to determine a difference of potential so small as that of one 10,080th of a Daniell. It is thus a very delicate means of observing and (as it can be graduated by a compensation-method) of measuring minute electromotive forces.

Lippmann's PhD thesis, presented to the Sorbonne on 24 July 1875, was on electrocapillarity.

Piezoelectricity
In 1881, Lippmann predicted the converse piezoelectric effect.

Colour photography

Above all, Lippmann is remembered as the inventor of a method for reproducing colours by photography, based on the interference phenomenon, which earned him the Nobel Prize in Physics for 1908.

In 1886, Lippmann's interest turned to a method of fixing the colours of the solar spectrum on a photographic plate. On 2 February 1891, he announced to the Academy of Sciences: "I have succeeded in obtaining the image of the spectrum with its colours on a photographic plate whereby the image remains fixed and can remain in daylight without deterioration." By April 1892, he was able to report that he had succeeded in producing colour images of a stained glass window, a group of flags, a bowl of oranges topped by a red poppy and a multicoloured parrot. He presented his theory of colour photography using the interference method in two papers to the Academy, one in 1894, the other in 1906.

The interference phenomenon in optics occurs as a result of the wave propagation of light. When light of a given wavelength is reflected back upon itself by a mirror, standing waves are generated, much as the ripples resulting from a stone dropped into still water create standing waves when reflected back by a surface such as the wall of a pool. In the case of ordinary incoherent light, the standing waves are distinct only within a microscopically thin volume of space next to the reflecting surface.

Lippmann made use of this phenomenon by projecting an image onto a special photographic plate capable of recording detail smaller than the wavelengths of visible light. The light passed through the supporting glass sheet into a very thin and nearly transparent photographic emulsion containing sub microscopically small silver halide grains. A temporary mirror of liquid mercury in intimate contact reflected the light back through the emulsion, creating standing waves whose nodes had little effect while their antinodes created a latent image. After development, the result was a structure of laminae, distinct parallel layers composed of submicroscopic metallic silver grains, which was a permanent record of the standing waves. In each part of the image, the spacing of the laminae corresponded to the half-wavelengths of the light photographed.

The finished plate was illuminated from the front at a nearly perpendicular angle, using daylight or another source of white light containing the full range of wavelengths in the visible spectrum. At each point on the plate, light of approximately the same wavelength as the light which had generated the laminae was strongly reflected back toward the viewer. Light of other wavelengths which was not absorbed or scattered by the silver grains simply passed through the emulsion, usually to be absorbed by a black anti-reflection coating applied to the back of the plate after it had been developed. The wavelengths, and therefore the colours, of the light which had formed the original image were thus reconstituted and a full-colour image was seen.

In practice, the Lippmann process was not easy to use. Extremely fine-grained high-resolution photographic emulsions are inherently much less light-sensitive than ordinary emulsions, so long exposure times were required. With a lens of large aperture and a very brightly sunlit subject, a camera exposure of less than one minute was sometimes possible, but exposures measured in minutes were typical. Pure spectral colours reproduced brilliantly, but the ill-defined broad bands of wavelengths reflected by real-world objects could be problematic. The process did not produce colour prints on paper and it proved impossible to make a good duplicate of a Lippmann colour photograph by rephotographing it, so each image was unique. A very shallow-angled prism was usually cemented to the front of the finished plate to deflect unwanted surface reflections, and this made plates of any substantial size impractical. The lighting and viewing arrangement required to see the colours to best effect precluded casual use. Although the special plates and a plate holder with a built-in mercury reservoir were commercially available for a few years circa 1900, even expert users found consistent good results elusive and the process never graduated from being a scientifically elegant laboratory curiosity. It did, however, stimulate interest in the further development of colour photography.

Lippmann's process foreshadowed laser holography, which is also based on recording standing waves in a photographic medium. Denisyuk reflection holograms, often referred to as Lippmann-Bragg holograms, have similar laminar structures that preferentially reflect certain wavelengths. In the case of actual multiple-wavelength colour holograms of this type, the colour information is recorded and reproduced just as in the Lippmann process, except that the highly coherent laser light passing through the recording medium and reflected back from the subject generates the required distinct standing waves throughout a relatively large volume of space, eliminating the need for reflection to occur immediately adjacent to the recording medium. Unlike Lippmann colour photography, however, the lasers, the subject and the recording medium must all be kept stable to within one quarter of a wavelength during the exposure in order for the standing waves to be recorded adequately or at all.

Integral photography

In 1908, Lippmann introduced what he called "integral photography", in which a plane array of closely spaced, small, spherical lenses is used to photograph a scene, recording images of the scene as it appears from many slightly different horizontal and vertical locations. When the resulting images are rectified and viewed through a similar array of lenses, a single integrated image, composed of small portions of all the images, is seen by each eye. The position of the eye determines which parts of the small images it sees. The effect is that the visual geometry of the original scene is reconstructed, so that the limits of the array seem to be the edges of a window through which the scene appears life-size and in three dimensions, realistically exhibiting parallax and perspective shift with any change in the position of the observer. This principle of using numerous lenses or imaging apertures to record what was later termed a light field underlies the evolving technology of light-field cameras and microscopes.

When Lippmann presented the theoretical foundations of his "integral photography" in March 1908, it was impossible to accompany them with concrete results. At the time, the materials necessary for producing a lenticular screen with the proper optical qualities were lacking. In the 1920s, promising trials were made by Eugène Estanave, using glass Stanhope lenses, and by Louis Lumière, using celluloid. Lippmann's integral photography was the foundation of research on 3D and animated lenticular imagery and also on color lenticular processes.

Measurement of time

In 1895, Lippmann evolved a method of eliminating the personal equation in measurements of time, using photographic registration, and he studied the eradication of irregularities of pendulum clocks, devising a method of comparing the times of oscillation of two pendulums of nearly equal period.

The coelostat

Lippmann also invented the coelostat, an astronomical tool that compensated for the Earth's rotation and allowed a region of the sky to be photographed without apparent movement.

Academic affiliations
Lippmann was a member of the Academy of Sciences from 8 February 1886 until his death, serving as its president in 1912. In addition, he was a Foreign Member of the Royal Society of London, a member of the Bureau des Longitudes, and a member of the Grand Ducal Institute of Luxembourg. He became a member of the Société française de photographie in 1892 and its president from 1896 to 1899. Lippmann was one of the founders of the Institut d'optique théorique et appliquée in France. Lippmann was the President of the Société Astronomique de France (SAF), the French astronomical society, from 1903–1904.

Honours

In Luxembourg City an Institute for fundamental scientific research was named after Lippmann (Centre de Recherche Public Gabriel Lippmann) which merged on 1 January 2015 with another major research centre to form the new Luxembourg Institute for Science and Technology (LIST).

Personal life
Lippmann married the daughter of the novelist Victor Cherbuliez in 1888. He died on 13 July 1921 aboard the steamer France while en route from Canada.

See also
 Autostereoscopy
 Brownian ratchet
 Light field camera
 List of Jewish Nobel laureates

References

Further reading
 J.P. Pier & J.A. Massard (eds) (1997):Gabriel Lippmann: Commémoration par la section des sciences naturelles, physiques et mathématiques de l’Institut grand-ducal de Luxembourg du 150e anniversaire du savant né au Luxembourg, lauréat du prix Nobel en 1908. Luxembourg, Section des sciences naturelles, physiques et mathématiques de l’Institut grand-ducal de Luxembourg en collaboration avec le Séminaire de mathématique et le Séminaire d’histoire des sciences et de la médecine du centre universitaire de Luxembourg, 139 p.
 Lebon, Ernest, "Savants du jour : biographie, bibliographie analytique des écrits", comprenant Portrait de Gabriel Lippmann. – 1911. p. 70, Gauthier-Villars (Paris), 1909–1913.
 Isabelle Bergoend, Le Dagobert optique, Editions Thierry Marchaisse, 2015.

External links

  including the Nobel Lecture, 14 December 1908 Colour Photography
 Gabriel Lippmann in Jewish Encyclopedia
 Centre de Recherche Public – Gabriel Lippmann

1845 births
1921 deaths
Nobel laureates in Physics
French Nobel laureates
20th-century physicists
École Normale Supérieure alumni
Lycée Henri-IV alumni
Color scientists
Experimental physicists
Members of the French Academy of Sciences
Foreign Members of the Royal Society
Corresponding members of the Saint Petersburg Academy of Sciences
Corresponding Members of the Russian Academy of Sciences (1917–1925)
19th-century French Jews
French physicists
Luxembourgian inventors
Luxembourgian Jews
Luxembourgian Nobel laureates
People from Luxembourg City
People who died at sea
Jewish physicists
Luxembourgian people of French descent
Presidents of the Société Française de Physique